Tarqui is a town and municipality in the Huila Department, Colombia.
Tarqui was used also used in the Inca civilization.

References

Municipalities of Huila Department